Angelo Rossi may refer to:

 Angelo Joseph Rossi (1878–1948), mayor of San Francisco
 Angelo Rossi (bishop) (died 1568), Italian Roman Catholic bishop
 Angelo de Rossi (1671–1715), Italian sculptor